D-cedilla (majuscule: Ḑ, minuscule: ḑ) is a letter of the Latin alphabet, consisting of the letter D with a cedilla under it. The letter stands for the voiced palatal plosive  in the Livonian alphabet. Before a 1904 spelling reform, the letter was also used in Romanian for the voiced alveolar fricative  in Latin-derived words where Latin had used ⟨d⟩ — the reform replaced this with a simple ⟨z⟩; see Obsolete letters of the Romanian alphabet.

The cedilla traditionally looks like a comma below in Livonian use. In other use, like UNGEGN romanizations, the cedilla is like a regular cedilla.

Computer encoding

See also 
 D-comma

Latin letters with diacritics